Tver Oblast is a federal subject of Russia (an oblast). Its administrative center is the city of Tver. From 1935 to 1990, it was known as Kalinin Oblast. Population: 

Tver Oblast is a region of lakes, such as Seliger and Brosno. Much of the remaining area is occupied by the Valdai Hills, where the Volga, the Western Dvina, and the Dnieper have their source.

Tver Oblast is one of the tourist regions of Russia with a modern tourist infrastructure. There are also many historic towns: Torzhok, Toropets, Zubtsov, Kashin, Vyshny Volochyok, and Kalyazin. The oldest of these is Rzhev, primarily known for the Battles of Rzhev in World War II. Staritsa was the seat of the last appanage principality in Russia. Ostashkov is a major tourist center.

Geography

Tver Oblast is located in the west of the middle part of the East European Plain. It stretches for 260 km from north to south and 450 km from west to east. The area borders Yaroslavl Oblast in the east, Vologda Oblast in the northeast, Novgorod Oblast in the northwest and north, Moscow in the southeast, Smolensk Oblast in the southwest, and Pskov Oblast in the west.

The area of Tver Oblast is 84201 km2, the 38th of 85 subjects. This is 0.49% of the territory of Russia. It is the largest territory (by area) of the Central Federal District.

Relief
Tver Oblast as a whole is characterized by flat terrain with alternating lowlands and highlands due to its location in the East European Plain. In the western part of the province, occupying about one-third of its area is Valdai Hills, with elevations of 200–300 m above sea level. It is surrounded by depressions, lowlands have a height of 100–150 m highest point of the area has a height of 347 m, is located on a hill Tsninsky (The top of the Valdai). The low point (61 m) - the extreme north-west area of the river's edge Kunya on the border with the Novgorod Oblast.

Natural resources
Minerals discovered and developed in the Tver Oblast are mainly deposits of ancient seas, lakes and swamps, and partly a consequence of glaciers (clastic rocks).

Minerals of industrial importance are the seams of brown coal Moscow coal basin. The largest deposit is Bolshoy Nelidovskiy, which gave between 1948 and 1996 about 21 million tons.

Widespread powerful peat deposits totaling 15.4 billion m³. The estimated reserves of peat are 2.051 billion tonnes, representing approximately 7% of the stock of European Russia. On an industrial scale mastered 43 peat deposits with a total area of about 300 hectares, the main exploited stocks are concentrated in five fields located in the central and southern parts of the oblast. From 1971 to 1999, has developed more than 44 million tons of peat.

Distributed limestones ( near the town of Bayou several centuries developed reserves of white Staritskogo stone). Dolomitic limestones are common along rivers Vazuza, Osugi, Tsna ( marble-like limestone), there are deposits of tile, brick and pottery ( refractory ) of clay and quartz sand, sapropel are numerous underground fresh water and mineral formations, open sources (the best known medicinal table water Kashinskaya).

Rivers
The region is a watershed of the Caspian Sea and Baltic Sea. In the south, the Belsky district has several tributaries of the upper reaches of the river Vop, the right tributary of the Dnieper River (basin of the Black Sea). Go to the Caspian Sea basin owns 70% of the region, the Baltic Sea - 29.7%.

In the region of more than 800 rivers longer than 10 km total length of about 17,000 km. The main river - Volga ( 685 km within the region). Its source is in Ostashkov area. The most important tributaries of the Volga: the Mologa (280 km), the Medveditsa (269 km), the Tvertsa (188 km). Other important rivers: the Western Dvina and its tributary the Mezha (259 km), the Msta and the Tsna (160 km).

Climate
The climate is humid continental, transitional from continental Russia to the more humid north-western regions. The area lies in a zone of comfort for living and recreation climatic conditions. The snow cover starts at the mid-November, the period with snow cover lasts 130–150 days, snow depth is about 40–60 cm, with a maximum of 80 cm.

History
There was already a settlement on the point of land at the confluence of the Tmaka River and Volga rivers in the 9th and 10th centuries. A fortress was built on the site much later, during the fighting between the Rostov-Suzdal princes and Novgorod Republic. 

In the 18th century, Tver became the center of the Tver province, first of the St. Petersburg province (1708-1727), and then of the Novgorod province.

In 1775, the Tver governorate was formed, in 1796 - the Tver province.

In 1929, Tver became the center of the Tver District of the Moscow Oblast.

On January 29, 1935, the Kalinin Oblast was formed from parts of the Western, Leningrad and Moscow Oblast.

Germany occupied part of this area in 1941-3.

On July 17, 1990, by decree of the Presidium of the Supreme Soviet of the RSFSR, the Kalinin Oblast was renamed the Tver Oblast. On April 21, 1992, the Congress of People's Deputies of Russia approved the decision of the presidium of the parliament to rename the region, amending Art. 71 of the Constitution of the RSFSR of 1978, which entered into force on May 16, 1992.

On 13 June 1996 Tver Oblast, alongside Leningrad Oblast and Saint Petersburg, signed a power-sharing agreement with the federal government, granting it autonomy. This agreement would be abolished on 19 February 2002.

Politics

During the Soviet period, the high authority in the oblast was shared between three persons: The first secretary of the Tver CPSU Committee (who in reality had the biggest authority), the chairman of the oblast Soviet (legislative power), and the Chairman of the oblast Executive Committee (executive power). After the abolition of Article 6 of the Constitution of the USSR in March 1990, the CPSU lost its monopoly on power. The head of the Oblast administration, and eventually the governor was appointed/elected alongside elected regional parliament.

The Charter of Tver Oblast is the fundamental law of the region. The Legislative Assembly of Tver Oblast is the province's standing legislative (representative) body. The Legislative Assembly exercises its authority by passing laws, resolutions, and other legal acts and by supervising the implementation and observance of the laws and other legal acts passed by it. The highest executive body is the Oblast Administration, which includes territorial executive bodies such as district administrations, committees, and commissions that facilitate development and run the day to day matters of the province. The Oblast administration supports the activities of the Governor who is the highest official and acts as guarantor of the observance of the oblast Charter in accordance with the Constitution of Russia.

Administrative divisions

Administratively, Tver Oblast is divided into two urban-type settlements under the federal government management (Ozyorny and Solnechny), five cities and towns of oblast significance (Tver, Kimry, Rzhev, Torzhok, and Vyshny Volochyok), and thirty-six districts.

Economy
Tver Oblast has a very strong economy due to its machinery industry in the automobile and aeronautics sectors.

Transportation
The Oblast has a well-developed infrastructure consisting of railway, river, motor vehicle, air, and pipeline transportation systems. Tver Oblast has one of the highest proportions of paved roads in the country. The region's location between Russia's two major cities, Moscow and St. Petersburg, has an obvious influence on traffic flows from Northern Europe and the Baltic countries to central Russia.

Passes through the region connecting the main "two capitals" Railway - October single-track railway with branches in Rzhev and Vyazma, Kuvshinovo and Selizharovo through Torzhok . Equally important are single-track diesel Moscow - Kashin - St. Petersburg and Moscow - Riga, and Yaroslavl - Bologoe - Great Luke and Bologoe - The bottom of the (station ), but very popular .

The area is crossed by two federal highways: M10 "Russia" and M9 "Baltic" . Of internal roads are significant Torzhok A111 - A112 Ostashkov and Tver-Rzhev. The length of paved roads - 16,032 km .

There are three civilian airports close to Tver:  Migalovo with a runway for commercial aviation, 2500m in length, airport local lines Zmeevo (now - heliport) and Orlovka Airfield (ICAO: UUTO).

The development of navigation on the Volga river port "Tver" with a cargo jetty for boats "river -sea" with a draft of up to four meters.

The region is crossed four beams railways going from Moscow to the north, northwest and west:

to Saint Petersburg via Tver - Bologoye (main course of the Oktyabrskaya Railway), west across the Rzhev - Velikiye Luki (branch of Riga, Vilnius, Warsaw and Kaliningrad - Berlin. to Kimry - Sonkovo - Pestovo - St. Petersburg; to Pskov through Tver - Bologoe. The largest railway junction of Tver Oblast is located in Bologoye. Bologovskiy assembly includes five areas : Moscow, St. Petersburg, Pskov, Yaroslavl, Great Luke.

The narrow gauge railway of KSM-2 factory, Tver serves a factory of building materials No.2 in Tver.

Demographics
Population: 

2012
Births: 15 476 (11.6 per 1000)
Deaths: 24 325 (18.2 per 1000) 
Total fertility rate: 1.65
Total fertility rate:
2009 - 1.55 | 2010 - 1.52 | 2011 - 1.54 | 2012 - 1.65 | 2013 - 1.64 | 2014 - 1.66 | 2015 - 1.70 | 2016 - 1.72(e)

Ethnic composition (2010):
Russians - 93.4%
Ukrainians - 1.2%
Armenians - 0.7%
Karelians - 0.6%
Tatars - 0.5%
Belarusians - 0.4%
Azeris - 0.4%
Romani people - 0.4%
Uzbeks - 0.3%
Others - 2.1%
99,260 people were registered from administrative databases, and could not declare an ethnicity. It is estimated that the proportion of ethnicities in this group is the same as that of the declared group.

Religion

According to a 2012 survey 30% of the population of Tver Oblast adheres to the Russian Orthodox Church, 9% are unaffiliated generic Christians, and 1% are Muslims. In addition, 34% of the population declares to be "spiritual but not religious", 20% is atheist, and 6% follows other religions or did not give an answer to the question.

Tver Karelians

A branch of Karelians, known as Tver Karelians live in the oblast. They numbered 140,567 in 1926. Due to heavy casualties suffered during the World War II, they vanished as a separate ethnic group from most parts of the oblast. The Tver Karelians numbered 14,633 according to the 2002 Census.

Culture

Bolshoe Zavidovo in Tver Oblast hosts Nashestvie, the largest festival of Russian rock, since 2009. Previously, in 2004–2008, it was hosted in Emmaus, also Tver Oblast.

References

Notes

Sources

External links

 Official website of Tver Oblast

 
States and territories established in 1935